Bosniak epic poetry (Bosnian: Bošnjačke epske narodne pjesme) is a form of epic poetry created by Bosniaks originating in today's Bosnia and Herzegovina and in the Sandžak region, which is a part of modern-day Serbia and Montenegro. Bosniak epic poetry developed during the Ottoman period. Historically, they were accompanied by the Gusle.

History 
The first records of Bosniak epic songs, discovered and dated so far, come from the first decades of the 18th century. However, there is information about Bosniak epics from the end of the 15th to the end of the 17th century, which were hidden for a long time in little-known travelogues, manuscripts of various profiles, chronicles, and war reports.

The Slovene Benedikt Kuripečić brought the earliest attestation about Bosniak oral epic poetry. The attestation originates from the year 1530, when Kuripečić, as a member of the Austrian embassy, on his way to Constantinople, passed through Bosnia and, near the walls of a small town called "Japra" together with other members of the embassy met the subaša Malkosthitz (Malkošić) accompanied by his 50 armed horsemen. "They sing a lot about his heroid ceeds in Croatia and Bosnia," says Kuripečić. Kuripečić's data explicitly states that the songs of the Bosniaks are created and shaped simultaneously with the poetry of other confessional groups in the neighbouring South Slavic areas. It is certainly a rarity in the epic tradition of the Slavs that a person enters epic tradition while they're still alive. Toma Maretić accounts in a mention of South Slavic folk songs "The first absolutely certain" evidence for Bosniak epic poetry in the 16th century. The Ottomanist Hazim Šabanović later verified that the subaša of Kamengrad from 1530 was Malkošić -  Malkoč Bey, buried in Banja Luka, and that he had the personal name Malkoč. The inhabitants of the Croatian frontier called him "the most fiery Bosnian beg" which corresponds to what Kuripečić recorded about him.

Slavic songs from the Ottoman era played a strong, inciting and artistic role in the Ottoman army, which included a significant proportion of Bosniaks. Evidence of this was left by the Hungarian writer Sebestyén Tinódi, an eyewitness and participant in the Ottoman-Hungarian battles, which he described in his chronicle in verse, which was published with the title in Latin (Chronica) in Kolozsvar, 1554.

Milman Parry and  Albert Lord 
Modern field studies of oral epics in the former Yugoslavia, organized by the American classicist Milman Parry in the period from 1932 to 1934 (in parts of Bosnia and Herzegovina, Sandžak and Montenegro), will establish the largest collection of South Slavic oral epics, and its most significant part consists of Bosniak epics. Helping Milman Parry, his student Albert B. Lord gained experience and love for further research on oral South Slavic epics, which was of crucial importance in deciding to continue collecting South Slavic poetry after Parry's death, again predominantly Bosniak. Albert Lord will return to the Balkans in the years 1935, 1937, 1950, 1951, and in the period between 1960 and 1965.

The entire collection is preserved in the "Parry Collection" at Harvard University's Library. The epic forms the core of this collection, in which there are over 1,000 epic poems.

A significant part of the South Slavic collection has been published, including many Bosniak epics in the "Serbian-Croatian Heroic Songs" edition. The first book consists of songs by singers from Novi Pazar (Salih Ugljanin, Sulejman Fortić, Džemal Zogić, Sulejman Makić and Alija Fjuljanin.

Avdo Međedović 

Avdo Međedović was a guslar from Bijelo Polje in Sandžak (1875-1955). The researchers, Milman Parry and Albert Lord were led to him after visiting a local kafana and asking for guslars. The researchers were astonished by Avdo and his ability to recite poetry; he was the most skillful performer that they encountered in their voyages through the Balkans. Lord writes that Avdo had a repertoire of fifty-eight epics. Parry recorded nine of these on phonograph discs, and Nikola Vujnović, the translator, wrote down four others from Avdo's dictation.

The most impressive song was "The Wedding of Smailagić Meho" (Ženidba Smailagić Meha). Avdo claims that he learned this song from his friend, who read the poem to him five or six times from a printed source. Despite this, Avdo's oral version is very different from the original published one, and much more descriptive:

It had been written down in 1885 by F. S. Krauss from an eighty-five-year old singer named Ahmed Isakov Šemić in Rotimlje, Hercegovina, and had been published in Dubrovnik in 1886. It was later reprinted, with minor changes in dialect, in cheap paper editions in Sarajevo, without notes and introduction. In this form it was read to Avdo. Krauss’s text has 2,160 lines; Avdo’s in 1935 had 12,323 lines and in 1950, 8,488 lines. ... The opening scene of "The Wedding of Meho, Son of Smail" is an assembly of the lords of the Turkish Border in the city of Kanidža. In Krauss’s published version this assembly occupies 141 lines; Avdo’s text has 1,053 lines.Avdo learned from many men, firstly from his father Ćor Huso Husein of Kolašin "whose reputation seems to have been prodigious". Lord mentions that though Avdo had a great endurance and mastery as a poet, "his voice was not especially good. He was hoarse, and the goiter on the left side of his neck could not have helped." in 1935 Lord asked Međedović to recall a song he heard only once, for this he asked another guslar, Mumin Vlahovljak of Plevlje, to sing his song "Bećiragić Meho", unknown to Međedović. After he heard the song of 2,294 lines, he sung it himself, but made it almost three times longer, 6,313 lines.

Recorded by Parry in 1935 

 "The Death of Mustajbey of the Lika" (2,436 lines)
 "Hrnjica Mujo Avenges the Death of Mustajbey of the Lika" (6,290 lines)
 "The Wedding of Vlahinjić Alija" (Ženidba Vlahinjić Alije) (6,042 lines; "a dictated version of this song" is slightly different: 5,883 lines)
 "The Heroism of Đerđelez Alija" (Junaštvo Đerzelez Alije) (2,624 lines).
 "Osmanbey Delibegović and Pavičević Luka" (13,331 lines)
 "Sultan Selim Captures Kandija" (5,919 lines)
 "The Illness of Emperor Dušan in Prizren" (645 lines)
 "The Captivity of Kara Omeragha" (1,302 lines)
 "Bećiragić Meho" (6,313 lines)

 Dictated in 1935

 "The Arrival of the Vizier in Travnik" (7,621 lines)
 "The Wedding of Meho, Son of Smail" (Ženidba Smailagić Meha) (12,311 lines)
 "Gavran Harambaša and Sirdar Mujo" (4,088 lines)
 "The Captivity of Tale of Orašac in Ozim" (3,738 lines, unfinished)

 Recorded by Lord 1950–1951

 "Osmanbey Delilbegović and Pavičević Luka" (6,119 lines)
 "The Wedding of Meho, Son of Smail" (8,488 lines)
 "Bećiragić Meho" (3,561 lines)

Characteristics 
Bosniak epic poetry, just like epic poetry belonging to other people contains mention of heroic and extraordinary deeds done by characters that can be described by the same terms. A often occurence among the most popular figures is that they challenge foes to duels (mejdane) no matter if they're tired or wounded. The heroic figure, despite their wounds or troubles, still defeats their enemy because of their sheer combat prowess.

Fairies, dragons and werewolves 
There is also a pre-Islamic element that can be found in Bosniak epic poetry. It is not rare for a fairy (vila) to heal or guide the epic figure through his journeys. This is a trait that Bosniak folk poetry shares with other South Slavic and Slavic national poetries. A good example of this would be the poem "The Mountain Fairies Heal Mujo Hrnjica" (Muja liječe vile planinkinje) where the mountain fairies heal the wounded hero Mujo and help him return home.

Except for the fairies being helpful in times of need, there is also a oral tradition in the Krajina region that is connected to the birth of Mujo and Halil Hrnjica. It says that "the mountain fairy nursed them with her milk, from which Mujo received great strength and heroism, and Halil with morning dew, from which he received great beauty." According to tradition, the mountain fairy defended the Kladuša tower and town against the attacks of the invaders along with the inhabitants of Krajina, and thus the mythological being of the fairy stayed with the people. Today the old town is called "Vilinski" (Fairy Town).

The dragon is also a prominent figure Bosniak epic poetry. The dragon would usually be a positive figure but could also be portrayed as a negative figure in some instances. In other instances, Đerzelez Alija could be the dragon. Cases of Sibinjanin Janko (John Hunyadi) being portrayed as a fiery werewolf also exist.

Gusle 
Bosniak epic poetry, just like the epic poetry of other Southern Slavs, was accompanied by the Gusle (Lahuta in Albanian). Kosta Hörmann mentions in his collections of epics from the territory of Bosnia and Herzegovina during Austro-Hungarian times that he "recognized joy when his Muslim hosts got lost in Gusle made from maple, after which a sonorous howl came from the singer's ringing throat. Songs about heroism and good horses". Milman Parry and Albert Lord also recorded many epic songs that were accompanied by the Gusle in their journeys through Bosnia, Herzegovina, and Montenegro.

Notable characters and events

Notable characters 
 Đerzelez Alija, legendary figure also found in the epic poetry of Kosovo and Northern Albania. A symbol of brotherly loyalty, he is known as "Gjergj Elez Alia" in Albanian and "Gerz Ilyas" in Hungarian. Popular throughout all of Bosnia, he was most popular in the Bosnian Krajina region.
 The Hrnjica Brothers, three brothers named Mujo, Halil and Omer, epic poetry also mentions their beautiful sister Ajkuna.
 Mustay-Bey of Lika, captain of Udbina and Sandzakbey of Lika.
 Gazi Husrev Bey, governor of the Bosnian Sandzak.
 Prince Marko, Serbian epic poetry figure, also mentioned in Bosniak epic poetry. Notably in "Đerzelez Alija and Prince Marko" (Đerzelez Alija i Kraljević Marko)
 Arnaut Osman, shared epic hero between Bosniak, Serb and Albanian epic poetry
 Vuk the Dragon-Despot, shared epic figure with Serbian poetry, most notably seen in  "Đerzelez Alija and Vuk Jajčanin" (Đerzelez Alija i Vuk Jajčanin)
 Sibinjanin Janko, most notably mentioned in  "Đerzelez Alija and the tsar of Stambol" (Gjerzelez Alija i Car od Stambola) where a duel between Sibinjanin Janko and Alija Đerzelez occurs
 Köprülüzade Fazıl Ahmed Pasha, Ottoman Vezir, most notably from the epic poem "Coming of vezir Ćuprilić in Travnik" (Dolazak bosanskog vezira Ćuprilića u Travnik)
 Filip Madžarin, Italian General Pippo Spano, rendered as "Filip the Hungarian" (Filip Madžarin) in South Slavic epic poetry

Notable events 
 Siege of Szigetvár (Boj kod Sigeta)
 Siege of Nagykanizsa (Boj kod Kaniže)
 Battle at Osijek (Boj kod Osijeka)
 Conflict between Turkey and Russia (Ratovanje između Turske i Rusije)
 Building of the bridge in Višegrad (Zidanje ćuprije u Višegradu)
 The song of Baghdad (Pjesma Bagdata)

See also 
 Gusle
 List of national poetries
 Đerzelez Alija
 Culture of Bosnia and Herzegovina
 Bosniaks
 History of Bosniaks

References 

Bosniak culture
Epic poetry